Chiral resolution, or enantiomeric resolution, is a process in stereochemistry for the separation of racemic compounds into their enantiomers. It is an important tool in the production of optically active compounds, including drugs. Another term with the same meaning is optical resolution.

The use of chiral resolution to obtain enantiomerically pure compounds has the disadvantage of necessarily discarding at least half of the starting racemic mixture.  Asymmetric synthesis of one of the enantiomers is one means of avoiding this waste.

Crystallization of diastereomeric salts
The most common method for chiral resolution involves conversion of the racemic mixture to a pair of diastereomeric derivatives by reacting them with chiral derivatizing agents, also known as chiral resolving agents. The derivatives which are then separated by conventional crystallization, and converted back to the enantiomers by removal of the resolving agent. The process can be laborious and depends on the divergent solubilities of the diastereomers, which is difficult to predict. Often the less soluble diastereomer is targeted and the other is discarded or racemized for reuse. It is common to test several resolving agents. Typical derivatization involves salt formation between an amine and a carboxylic acid. Simple deprotonation then yields back the pure enantiomer. Examples of chiral derivatizing agents are tartaric acid and the amine brucine. The method was introduced (again) by Louis Pasteur in 1853 by resolving racemic tartaric acid with optically active (+)-cinchotoxine.

Case study
One modern-day method of chiral resolution is used in the organic synthesis of the drug duloxetine:

In one of its steps the racemic alcohol 1 is dissolved in a mixture of toluene and methanol to which solution is added optically active (S)-mandelic acid 3. The alcohol (S)-enantiomer forms an insoluble diastereomeric salt with the mandelic acid and can be filtered from the solution. Simple deprotonation with sodium hydroxide liberates free (S)-alcohol. In the meanwhile the (R)-alcohol remains in solution unaffected and is recycled back to the racemic mixture by epimerization with hydrochloric acid in toluene. This process is known as RRR synthesis in which the R's stand for Resolution-Racemization-Recycle.

Common resolving agents

Antimony potassium tartrate, an anion, that forms diastereomeric salts with chiral cations.
Camphorsulfonic acid, an acid that forms diastereomeric salts with chiral amines
1-Phenylethylamine, a base that forms diastereomeric salts with chiral acids. Many related chiral amines have been demonstrated.

The chiral pool consists of many widely available resolving agents.

Spontaneous resolution and related specialized techniques
Via the process known as spontaneous resolution, 5-10% of all racemates are known to crystallize as mixtures of enantiopure crystals.  Louis Pasteur exploited this phenomenon by the manual separation of left-handed and right-handed sodium ammonium tartrate crystals in 1849. These experiments underpinned his discovery of optical activity.  In 1882 he went on to demonstrate that by seeding a supersaturated solution of sodium ammonium tartrate with a d-crystal on one side of the reactor and a l-crystal on the opposite side, crystals of opposite handedness will form on the opposite sides of the reactor.

Spontaneous resolution has also been demonstrated with racemic methadone. In a typical setup 50 grams dl-methadone is dissolved in petroleum ether and concentrated. Two millimeter-sized d- and l-crystals are added and after stirring for 125 hours at 40 °C two large d- and l-crystals are recovered in 50% yield.

Another form of direct crystallization is preferential crystallization also called resolution by entrainment of one of the enantiomers. For example, seed crystals of (−)-hydrobenzoin induce crystallization of this enantiomer from an ethanol solution of (±)-hydrobenzoin.

Chiral column chromatography
In chiral column chromatography the stationary phase is made chiral with similar resolving agents as described above.

References

Stereochemistry